Crosby Township may refer to the following townships in the United States:

 Crosby Township, Pine County, Minnesota
 Crosby Township, Hamilton County, Ohio